Jeffrey Young OBE (16 September 1942 – 3 October 2005) was a Welsh rugby union player who gained 23 caps for Wales as a hooker between 1968 and 1973.

Young was born in Blaengarw and educated at Garw Grammar School and St Luke's College, Exeter. He played five times for the Welsh Secondary Schools XV. A teacher by profession, Young played club rugby for Blaengarw, Harrogate, Bridgend and London Welsh. He also played for the East Wales side that earned a draw with the touring All Blacks in 1967.

He made his debut for Wales against Scotland in Cardiff in 1968, and became the first-choice hooker for Wales, playing in 22 of the next 26 internationals. He played in the Grand Slam winning side of 1971 and made his  last international appearance against France in Paris in 1973, after which Bobby Windsor became the first-choice hooker. Young was selected for the British and Irish Lions tour to South Africa in 1968 and played in the first test.

In 1971 he left teaching and joined the R.A.F. and became a Wing Commander, coaching the RAF and British Combined Services on their joint tour to New Zealand with British Police in 1988. In 1991 he became the Welsh Rugby Union's first technical director and later became Director of Rugby at Harrogate. He was awarded the OBE for his services to rugby and the R.A.F. Jeff Young died of Alzheimer's disease in Harrogate in October 2005.

References

External links
Jeff Young Obituary

1942 births
2005 deaths
Alumni of the University of Exeter
Bridgend RFC players
British & Irish Lions rugby union players from Wales
Combined Services rugby union players
Deaths from Alzheimer's disease
London Welsh RFC players
Neurological disease deaths in England
Officers of the Order of the British Empire
Royal Air Force officers
Royal Air Force rugby union players
Rugby union hookers
Rugby union players from Blaengarw
Wales international rugby union players
Welsh rugby union players